The Taipei Chinese Orchestra (TCO) is a Chinese orchestra based in Zhongzheng District, Taipei, Taiwan, as the first professional ensemble of its kind in Taiwan.

History
In 1979, Taipei Chinese Orchestra was founded by Taipei City Government.

On 6 November 1999, the Taipei City Government established the Department of Cultural Affairs, so the Taipei Chinese Orchestra then belonged to Department of Cultural Affairs, Taipei City Government.

See also
 List of symphony orchestras in Taiwan

References

External links

Taiwanese orchestras
Chinese orchestras
Musical groups established in 1979
1979 establishments in Taiwan